Leon Green (March 31, 1888 – June 15, 1979) was an American legal realist and long-tenured dean of Northwestern University School of Law (1929–1947). He also served as professor at Yale Law School (1926–1929) and the University of Texas School of Law (1915–1918, 1920–1926, and 1947–1977).

Born in Oakland, Louisiana, Green earned an A.B. from Ouachita College in 1908 and LL.B from the University of Texas in 1915.

At Northwestern, Green presided over changes in curriculum to provide students effective training in the changing field of law. He also determined that the best way to raise the law school's stature was to raise the quality of students. Thus, he fought University pressure to raise revenues by admitting unqualified students, and he led a campaign to provide decent housing as a means to attract top students.

A leading expert in the field of Tort law, Green authored the groundbreaking treatise, The Rationale of Proximate Cause (1927).

Three of Green's students received appointments to the United States Supreme Court: John Paul Stevens and Arthur Goldberg from Northwestern University, and Thomas Campbell Clark from the University of Texas.

Green also served as dean of the University of North Carolina School of Law (1926–1927).

Leon Green said of the relevance of court decisions in time: "The decision of a court is no more 'the law,' than the light from yesterday's lamp is electricity."

Dean Green died in Austin, Texas, on June 15, 1979.

Books written by Leon Green
The Rationale of Proximate Cause (1927)
Judge and Jury (1930)
The Judicial Process in Tort Cases (1931; 2d ed. 1939)
Injuries to Relations (1940)
The Litigation Process in Tort Law (1966)

References

https://ssrn.com/abstract=339562
http://files.library.northwestern.edu/findingaids/green_leon.pdf#search=%22leon%20green%22
http://www.utexas.edu/faculty/council/2000-2001/memorials/AMR/Green/green.html
https://archive.today/20070614165923/http://www.wisbar.org/AM/Template.cfm?Section=Wisconsin_Lawyer&TEMPLATE=/CM/ContentDisplay.cfm&CONTENTID=50122
http://users.ox.ac.uk/~alls0079/Stanford%20Causation2.pdf#search=%22leon%20green%20rationale%20of%20proximate%20cause%22
http://www.tshaonline.org/handbook/online/articles/fgr86

External links
Leon Green Papers, 1929-1947, Northwestern University Archives, Evanston, Illinois
Leon Green papers, 1904-1979, Archival Collections - UT Law Faculty 

Deans of law schools in the United States
1888 births
1979 deaths
American legal scholars
Ouachita Baptist University alumni
University of Texas School of Law alumni
Northwestern University Pritzker School of Law faculty
20th-century American academics